Alegazovo (Älägäź) is a rural locality (a selo) and the administrative centre of Alegazovsky Selsoviet, Mechetlinsky District, Bashkortostan, Russia. The population was 1,341 as of 2010. There are 18 streets.

Geography 
Alegazovo is located 13 km west of Bolsheustyikinskoye (the district's administrative centre) by road. Malokyzylbayevo is the nearest rural locality.

References 

Rural localities in Mechetlinsky District